The Jackson DiamondKats played one year in the independent Texas-Louisiana League, struggling to a last place finish in 2000 (38-74) and finishing 6th of 8 teams in attendance (37,066). Managed by Steve Dillard, they had no All-Stars. Ryan Creek (5-5, 3.07) was third in the league in ERA. The biggest name was former major leaguer Mark Carreon (.340, .527 SLG in 150 AB).

External links
Jackson DiamondKats - Baseball Cube

Sports in Jackson, Mississippi
Defunct minor league baseball teams
Baseball teams disestablished in 2000
Defunct baseball teams in Mississippi
Defunct independent baseball league teams
Baseball teams established in 2000
2000 establishments in Mississippi